Teguise is a municipality in the central part of the island of Lanzarote in the Las Palmas province in the Canary Islands. The population is 22,342 (as of 1 January 2019), and the area is 263.98 km2. It is located north of Arrecife and south of Haría. The seat of the municipality is the town of Teguise. The municipality also comprises a number of neighbouring islands including Graciosa (with 733 inhabitants in 2019), Alegranza, Roque del Este, Roque del Oeste and Montaña Clara.

The artist and architect César Manrique was born in the area. The insect of the island is the cochineal from which carmine, a dye, is extracted.

Historical population

Settlements

Las Cabreras
Caleta de Sebo 
Casas de Pedro Barba 
Caleta de Famara
Las Caletas
Costa Teguise
Guatiza
Las Laderas
El Mojón
Mozaga
Muñique
Nazaret
Sóo
Tahiche
Tao
Teguise
Teseguite
Tiagua
Los Valles
Los Ancones
Caleta de Caballo 
Los Cocoteros
Charco del Palo
Tomarén

Sites of interest
Jardín de Cactus, in Guatiza 
Wind sculpture

See also

List of municipalities in Las Palmas

External links 
 Teguise: white heritage and mahogany crosses in the old capital of Lanzarote (in English)

References 

Municipalities in Lanzarote